The term Arab League peace plan may be one of the following terms:

Arab Peace Initiative in the Israeli-Palestinian conflict (2002 and 2007)
Arab League peace plan in the Syrian uprising (2011–2012)